Frederick George Howard (8 June 1805 – 18 November 1834) was a British politician.

The second son of George Howard, Howard served as a captain in the 90th Regiment of Foot.  He stood in the 1832 UK general election in Morpeth.  He won election as a Whig, and focused on free trade and the abolition of monopolies.

In 1834, Howard was travelling in a curricle near Bagnalstown, when the horse bolted.  He attempted to jump clear of the vehicle, but hit his head hard and died.

References

1805 births
1834 deaths
Deaths by horse-riding accident
British Army officers
Frederick George Howard
UK MPs 1832–1835
Whig (British political party) MPs for English constituencies